DRB-HICOM Football Club is a football club established to compete in Malaysia football league.  The team played in the Malaysia Premier League (the second tier of the country's professional league - Liga M) since 2010 until 2016 before they withdrew from the league.  It was simultaneously decided that the club's 2nd team (previously known as DRB-HICOM 2) to remain competing in an amateur league. Therefore, DRB-HICOM FC remained competing in the Kuala Lumpur Football Association (KLFA) League, where they have played since 2014.  This team is composed of employees of DRB-HICOM Group of Companies and experienced local players.

The club is commonly known as The Great Bees (D'GreatBees), and previously used Proton City Stadium in Tanjung Malim as their official home ground. The well-facilitated stadium currently has a capacity for 3,000 fans.  However, since it now plays in a league in the Klang Valley, DRB-HICOM FC is now based in Glenmarie, Shah Alam; the PROTON Casting Plant field is about 3 km away from the headquarters of DRB-HICOM Berhad. The conglomerate owns 50.1% of national carmaker PROTON.

Club's names

 2008-2013    : Pos Football Club (Pos FC)
 2014–present : DRB-HICOM Football Club (DRB-HICOM FC)

Official team attire

History

The club was established in 2008 as Pos Malaysia Football Club, by the national postal company Pos Malaysia Berhad . Then in 2011, DRB-HICOM acquired the business from the government's investment arm, Khazanah Nasional, and in 2012, efforts began to take root to adopt the DRB-HICOM brand as the club's name. This was finalised in 2014, and the club's current name was formalised. A year after its formation, Pos Malaysia FC played in the FAM Cup, the third-tier of the Malaysian Football League. The debut season was a successful one, emerging as champions of the 8-team tournament. En route, they recorded a W-D-L record of 11-3-2, scoring 29 goals and letting in 11. Promotion to the second tier Malaysia Premier League in 2010 was approved after Football Association of Malaysia's Local Competitions Committee approved the promotion. Their debut season in the league saw Pos FC finishing the season in eighth place in the 12-team competition. Subsequently, their performance was as follows: -

2011 - 9th place

2012 - 7th place

2013 - 6th place

2014 (as DRB-HICOM FC) - 7th place

2015 - 10th place

2016 (Final season 1st team compete in professional league) -  7th place

The company sees the existence of the club as an internal corporate social responsibility effort. It presents employees with a platform to showcase their other talents, which can potentially become an important avenue to uncover and nurture talents within the Group. These players can go on to become stars in the local as well as regional football arena in the future.

Since its inception, as a professional club, DRB-HICOM FC attracted local players and international footballers from Nigeria, Japan, Croatia, Ghana, Denmark and South Korea to don DRB-HICOM FC's colours and to continue building the club's reputation in the domestic league. Now as an amateur club, more locals are signed as players. In the 2017/18 season, it only had one foreign player.

Club officials as at 2022

List of players - 2022 season

Team staff - 2022

List of head coaches During M-League season (2009–2016)

List of head coaches for KLFA League (2014-now)

Honours

Domestic competitions
 Malaysia FAM League
  Champion : 2009
 KLFA Division 1 League
  Champion : 2017-18
 KLFA Super League
  Champion : 2019

Team achievement - Malaysia Premier League 
 2014 Malaysia Premier League - 8th
 2015 Malaysia Premier League - 10th
 2016 Malaysia Premier League - 7th

Team achievement - Kuala Lumpur (KLFA) League 
 2014 Kuala Lumpur League 
 Division 1 - 10th
 2016 Kuala Lumpur League 
 Division 1 - Quarter Final
 FA Cup - Quarter Final
 2017/2018 Kuala Lumpur League 
 Division 1 - Champions (won final playoffs 2–1 against PULAPOL FC)
 2019/2020 Kuala Lumpur League 
 Super Division - Champions (won final playoffs against IMIGRESEN FC)
 FA Cup - Reached Quarter Final stage (competition called-off due to COVID-19 pandemic)
 2020 - No league due to COVID-19 pandemic
 2021 - No league due to COVID-19 pandemic

Official partners 
2014

- DRB-HICOM

- Pos Malaysia
2015

2015

- DRB-HICOM

- Pos Malaysia

- PROTON

- Bank Muamalat

- Mizuno

- Altel Communications
2016

2016

- DRB-HICOM

- Pos Malaysia

- PROTON

- Bank Muamalat

- Mizuno

- DRB-HICOM Auto Solutions (DHAS)
2017/18

2017/18

- DRB-HICOM

- Pos Malaysia (Official Partner)

- Bank Muamalat (Official Bank)

- DRB-HICOM Environmental Services (Official Facility Management Partner)

- Sky Hawk Apparel (Official Attire Supplier)

- Glenmarie Golf & Country Club (Official Facilities Services Provider)
2019/20

2019/20

- DRB-HICOM

- Composites Technology Research Malaysia - CTRM  (Official Partner)

- Bank Muamalat (Official Bank)

- Pos Malaysia (Official Partner)

- Liberty Insurance (Official Partner)

- PROTON Holdings (Official Partner)

- DRB-HICOM Environmental Services (Official Facility Management Partner)

- Isuzu HICOM Malaysia Sdn. Bhd (Official Partner)

- Mitsubishi Motors Malaysia (Official Partner)

- Sky Hawk Apparel (Official Attire Supplier)

- Glenmarie Golf & Country Club (Official Facilities Services Provider)

2022

- DRB-HICOM 

- HICOM HBPO

- Sky Hawk Apparel (Official Attire Supplier)

See also
 Pos Malaysia
PROTON
 DRB-HICOM

External links
 DRB-HICOM Berhad Official website (Club's Owner)

References

 
Football clubs in Malaysia
2009 establishments in Malaysia
DRB-HICOM
Works association football clubs in Malaysia